"Bluebottle Stew" is the third single by Irish band Tír na nÓg. It was released in 1972 by Chrysalis Records and distributed by Festival in Australia and New Zealand on 7" vinyl with "Come and See the Show" as its B-side.

Format and track listing
Australia 7" single (CYK-4798)
"Bluebottle Stew" (Sonny Condell) – 2:15
"Come and See the Show" (Condell) – 3:12

New Zealand 7" single (CYK-4798)
"Bluebottle Stew" (Sonny Condell) – 2:15
"Come and See the Show" (Condell) – 3:12

Personnel
Sonny Condell - vocals, guitar
Leo O'Kelly - vocals, guitar

References

1972 singles
Tír na nÓg (band) songs
1972 songs
Chrysalis Records singles